André Dehertoghe (19 June 1941 in Leuven – 25 August 2016) was a Belgian runner who competed in the 1968 and 1972 Summer Olympics. He finished fifth in the 1500 metres at the 1969 European Championships.

References

1941 births
2016 deaths
Belgian male middle-distance runners
Athletes (track and field) at the 1968 Summer Olympics
Athletes (track and field) at the 1972 Summer Olympics
Olympic athletes of Belgium